Cockthorpe Common, Stiffkey is a  biological Site of Special Scientific Interest east of Wells-next-the-Sea in Norfolk. It is in the Norfolk Coast Area of Outstanding Natural Beauty.

This common in the valley of the River Stiffkey has a varied chalk grassland flora on steep slopes. Herbs are abundant, including salad burnet, dropwort, common rock-rose, large thyme and cowslip.

A public footpath goes through the site.

References

Sites of Special Scientific Interest in Norfolk